Christian Reuter (1665 in Kütten – 1712 or later) was a German author.

Work
He was especially effective in character delineation. In his L'honnête femme; oder die ehrliche Frau zu Pfissine (“The honest woman of Pfissine,” 1695), he skillfully uses Molière's fable in Les précieuses ridicules. His chief work is the novel Schelmuffskys Reisebeschreibung (“Schelmuffsky's trip description,” 1696), which was edited by Schullerus in 1885, and his other writings include Der ehrlichen Frau Schlampampe Krankheit und Tod (“Illness and death of the honest Frau Schlampampe,” 1696) and Letztes Denk- und Ehrenmahl der Frau Schlampampe (“Last monument to Frau Schlampampe,” 1697), which were republished in 1890.

Notes

References

 
 Helen Walden: Christian Reuter: Is He a Barock Poet, or Not? In: The German Quarterly, März 1936, Vol. 9, no. 2, p. 71–77.

External links
 
 
 Schelmuffsky. Translated by Wayne Wonderley. Chapel Hill: The University of North Carolina Press (1962) (Open Access)

1665 births
1710s deaths
17th-century German novelists
18th-century German novelists
German male novelists
17th-century German writers
18th-century German male writers
17th-century German male writers